Robert Pope (fl. 1376–1388) of Gloucester, was an English politician.

He was a Member (MP) of the Parliament of England for Gloucester in 1376, April 1384 and February 1388.

References

Year of birth missing
Year of death missing
English MPs 1376
People from Gloucester
Members of the Parliament of England (pre-1707) for Gloucester
English MPs April 1384
English MPs February 1388